Jeff(rey) or Geoff(rey) Price may refer to:

Jeffrey Price (screenwriter), part of the Hollywood screenwriting team
Jeff Price, head men's basketball coach at Georgia Southern University
Geoff Price, American football player
Jeffrey L. Price, chronobiologist
David Price (mineral physicist) (Geoffrey David Price, born 1956), British mineral physicist